Pan Am Flight 812 (PA812), operated by a Pan American World Airways Boeing 707-321B registered N446PA and named Clipper Climax, was a scheduled international flight from Hong Kong to Los Angeles, California, with intermediate stops at Denpasar, Sydney, Nadi, and Honolulu. On April 22, 1974, it crashed into rough mountainous terrain while preparing for a runway 09 approach to Denpasar after a 4-hour 20-minute flight from Hong Kong. All 107 people on board perished. Until the 1991 Jakarta Indonesian Air Force C-130 crash, it was the deadliest aviation accident to happen in Indonesian soil.

Accident
Flight 812, a regularly scheduled flight from Hong Kong to Los Angeles via Bali, Sydney, Nadi, and Honolulu, departed Hong Kong on April 22, 1974, at 11:08 UTC (7:08 pm Hong Kong time). The estimated flying time to Bali was 4 hours and 23 minutes. At 15:23 UTC (12:23 am Bali time in 1974), Flight 812 was on final approach to Bali. The aircraft reported reaching .  The Bali Tower gave instructions to continue the approach and to report when the runway was in sight. Acknowledgement was made by Flight 812 by saying, "Check inbound". At 15:26 the pilot-in-command requested the visibility by calling, "Hey – Tower, what is your visibility out there now?"

However, according to the transcription of Air Traffic Control voice recorder this message was never received by the Bali Tower. Apparently this was the last message transmitted by the aircraft. The Bali Tower kept trying to contact the aircraft by calling, "Clipper eight one two, Bali Tower", and "Clipper eight one two, Bali Tower, how do you read", several times. However, no answer was received from the aircraft.

Search and rescue 
Bali control tower immediately lost all contact with the plane and declared that the plane was missing. Indonesian paratroops and authorities were immediately deployed to the area where last contact had been established by Flight 812. The last contact was established by Flight 812 at Mesehe Mountain, a dormant volcano located near the airport.

The wreckage was found a day later by 2 local villagers. They reported that there were no survivors.

Evacuation of the bodies was hampered due to the terrain of the crash site, which was located in a mountainous area. Because of the location rescuers had to cancel the evacuation process via air. Indonesian Army Officers stated that the rescue operation would take four or five days. On April 25, around 300 rescuers were deployed onto the crash site. Indonesian Army stated that the evacuation process would start at April 26. They later added that they had recovered around 43 bodies.

Passengers and crews
There were 96 passengers from 9 countries on board. 70 passengers were bound for Bali. 24 were bound for Sydney. 2 were bound for Nadi. Pan Am reported that about seventy passengers were tourists bound for a holiday in Bali.

Several memorial plaques are to be found for this crash in Jl. Padang Galak, next to the beach Temple, Kesiman, Denpasar East, Indonesia.

The pilot in command was 52-year old Captain Donald Zinke. He had flown a total of 18,247 hours including 7,192 hours in Boeing 707/720 aircraft. He held a DC-4 aircraft rating and a Boeing 707 aircraft rating. The co-pilot was 40-year-old First Officer John Schroeder. He held a valid Boeing 707 rating and had a total flying hours of 6,312 hours including 4,776 hours in Boeing 707/720 aircraft. The other pilot was 38-year old Third Officer Melvin Pratt, held a valid Commercial pilot's licence and a current instrument rating. At the time of the accident, he had flown a total of 4,255 hours including 3,964 hours in Boeing 707/720 aircraft. The other cockpit crew members were 48-year-old Flight Engineer Timothy Crowley and 43-year old Flight Engineer Edward Keating.

Investigation
Multiple eyewitnesses stated that the plane was on fire before it struck the Mesehe Mountain. Others stated that Captain Zinke was trying to land from the northwest, where the mountains were located, rather than the usual route (from the east). The east side didn't have any steep terrain. They also stated that the plane exploded shortly after it struck the mountain. There were also reports that the plane was circling during the accident. Pan American Airways then stated that they declined to comment on the cause of the crash. They stated that they would wait for the result of the investigation.

As the aircraft was registered in the United States, the NTSB was called for the investigation of the crash. Representatives of the victims from their origin countries were also called by the Indonesian Government. The FBI was also called for the identification of the victims.

The FBI set up a crisis camp in a hangar in Denpasar. At the time, only 10 percent of Americans were fingerprinted. The identification was later hampered by the Indonesian Government's decision to stop the identification of the victims and the investigation of the crash.

The flight data recorder was recovered on 16 July and the cockpit voice recorder was found on 18 July 1974. The CVR was recovered in good condition, while the FDR had some damage on its outer case due to the crash.

Examination on the wreckage of Flight 812 concluded that the plane didn't break up in flight, as the debris of the plane were concentrated in a specific area, rather than dispersed. The NTSB didn't find engine malfunctions, and added that they didn't find evidence that may indicate that the plane was not airworthy.

Sequence of events based on the final report
The following sequence of events were based on the final report:
The crew were trying to contact Bali Air Traffic Control, however they encountered several difficulties in establishing contact with Bali Air Traffic Control. First contact between the aircraft and Bali Tower was established at 15:06 UTC whereupon Bali Tower instructed Flight 812 to contact Bali Control on frequency 128.3 MHz, because the aircraft was still within the jurisdiction area of Bali Control. This was acknowledged by Flight 812 accordingly. Subsequently, communication between the aircraft and the ground was normal.

Captain Zinke didn't encounter any difficulties on the approach procedure to Denpasar's Ngurah Rai Airport. The procedure stated that before they could land at the airport, the flight should maintain  and then they should execute the full ADF let-down procedure. The pilots were aware that there was mountainous terrain on the north of the airport and that flight level 120 would clear them from the mountains. The crew then informed the controllers of the ETA of Flight 812, and stated their intention to make a right turn within  from the beacon for a track out on 261 degrees, descending to  followed by a procedure to turn over the water for final approach on Runway 09.

At 15:18 UTC, the crew noticed that the number one ADF was "swinging" while ADF number two remained steady. Few seconds later, the crew of Flight 812 reported to Bali Control that he was over the station turning outbound descending to flight level 120. This was acknowledged by Bali Control and Flight 812 was then instructed to change over to Bali Tower. After establishing contact with Bali Tower, Flight 812 reported that they were making outbound procedure at flight level 110 (approximately ) and requested for lower altitude. They were later cleared for lower altitude.

The crew of Flight 812 then decided to execute an early right turn on 263 degrees. The early execution of the right turn was caused by the malfunctioning ADF number one, which swung. The input was made since the crew assumed that they were nearing the NDB (Non-directional beacon). Investigators stated that the right hand turn was made at a position approximately 30 NM North of the beacon.

Several attempts were made to regain proper indication on the ADFs after the turn, however this couldn't happen since the plane was "shielded" by the mountain. The crew then continued their approach and the plane subsequently impacted terrain.

Conclusion
It was determined that the premature execution of a right-hand turn to join the 263-degree outbound track, which was based on the indication given by only one of the radio direction finders while the other one was still in steady condition, is the most probable cause of the accident.

Aftermath
The crash of Flight 812 was a wake-up call for Pan Am. Flight 812 was the third 707 the airline had lost in the Pacific in less than a year after Pan Am Flight 806 in Pago Pago on 30 January 1974 and Pan Am Flight 816 in Papeete on 22 July 1973. Following the crash, Pan Am addressed the issue and encouraged an early form of Crew Resource Management. Flight 812 was the final 707 lost following the safety improvements.

Due to the crash of Flight 812, the Federal Aviation Administration ordered an in-depth inspection of the airline's worldwide flight operations including pilot training, area qualification, operational procedures, pilot supervision and scheduling, line-check procedures, and other related matters of safety. The FAA did not criticize Pan American Airways or imply unsafe operations. They estimated about 3 months investigation time.

On 8 May 1974, Pan American Airways ordered the installation of a new cockpit warning device designed to prevent crashes such as this April 22 incident. The entire fleet of 140 airplanes under Pan Am received the device. The apparatus was engineered and manufactured by Sundstrand Data Control, Inc. The ground proximity warning system provided additional indications, for example if a plane was heading for a mountain slope or if it was too low for a landing. This was an automatic supplement to more conventional altitude warning systems, already installed on most Pan Am aircraft.

In the aftermath of the crash, Pan Am stopped their Hong Kong to Sydney flights via Bali. A monument was erected by the Regent of Badung Regency Wayan Dana and Bali Governor Soekarmen, with the names of 107 victims inscribed on the monument.

See also
 Invicta International Airlines Flight 435
 Alitalia Flight 404
Trigana Air Flight 267
Santa Barbara Airlines Flight 518
Intercontinental de Aviación Flight 256
Turkish Airlines Flight 6491
Korean Air Flight 801

References

External links
 "Pan American World Airways, Boeing 707-321C, accident at Tinga-Tinga, Bali, Indonesia, on 22 April 1974.." (Final accident report) (Archive) 20 March 1975 – released by the Ministry of Transport, Communications and Tourism, Indonesia. – Alternate link
"107 Feared Dead in Bali Air Crash." Toledo Blade. Tuesday April 23, 1974. Page 1. Google News (18 of 37).
"Jetliner crash on Bali claims 107 aboard." The Bryan Times. Tuesday April 23, 1974. Volume 26, No. 96. Page 1. Google News (1 of 9).
Account of U.S. diplomat at the scene., Association for Diplomatic Studies and Training (ADST)
 , Associated Press

Aviation accidents and incidents in Indonesia
Aviation accidents and incidents in 1974
Accidents and incidents involving the Boeing 707
812
Transport in Bali
Denpasar
Airliner accidents and incidents involving controlled flight into terrain
Airliner accidents and incidents caused by pilot error
Airliner accidents and incidents caused by instrument failure
1974 in Indonesia
April 1974 events in Asia